The Kalinago language, also known as Igneri (Iñeri, Inyeri, etc.), was an Arawakan language historically spoken by the Kalinago of the Lesser Antilles in the Caribbean. Kalinago proper became extinct by about 1920 due to population decline and colonial period deportations resulting in language death, but an offshoot survives as Garifuna, primarily in Central America.

Despite its name, Kalinago was not closely related to the Carib language of the mainland Caribs. Instead, it appears to have been a development of the Arawakan language spoken by the islands' earlier Igneri inhabitants, which incoming Caribs adopted in the pre-Columbian era. During the French colonial period, Carib men also spoke a Cariban-derived pidgin amongst themselves.

History
At the time of European contact, the Kalinago lived throughout the Windward Islands of the Lesser Antilles, from Guadeloupe to Grenada. Contemporary traditions indicated the Caribs (or Kaliphuna) had conquered these islands from their previous inhabitants, the Igneri. Because the Kalinago were thought to have descended from the mainland Caribs (Kalina) of South America, it was long assumed that they spoke Carib or a related Cariban language. However, studies in the 20th century determined that the language of the Antillean Caribs was not Cariban, but Arawakan, related to the Lokono language on the South American mainland and more distantly to the Taíno language of the Greater Antilles.

Modern scholars have proposed several hypotheses accounting for the prevalence of an Arawak language among the Kalinago. Scholars such as Irving Rouse suggested that Caribs from South America conquered the Igneri but did not displace them, and took on their language over time. Others doubt there was an invasion at all. Sued Badillo proposed that Igneri living in the Lesser Antilles adopted the "Carib" identity due to their close economic and political ties with the rising mainland Carib polity in the 16th century. In any event, the fact that the Kalinago' language evidently derived from a pre-existing Arawakan variety has led some linguists to term it "Igneri". It appears to have been as distinct from Taíno as from mainland Arawak varieties.

During the period of French colonization in the 17th century, and possibly earlier, male Kalinago used a Cariban-based pidgin in addition to the Arawakan Kalinago language. The pidgin was evidently similar to one used by mainland Caribs to communicate with their Arawak neighbors. Berend J. Hoff and Douglas Taylor hypothesized that it dated to the time of the Carib expansion through the islands, and that males maintained it to emphasize their origins. However, scholars who doubt the existence of a Carib invasion suggest this pidgin was a later development acquired by contact with indigenous peoples of the mainland.

Phonology

Vowels

Consonants 
Kalinago has 15 consonants.

 A number of people  also pronounced /ɕ/ as an alveolar .

References

Arawakan languages
Igneri
Languages of Dominica
Languages of Saint Vincent and the Grenadines
Indigenous languages of the Caribbean
Languages of Martinique
Languages of Guadeloupe
Languages of Grenada
Languages of Saint Lucia
Languages extinct in the 1920s
Kalinago